The Roman Catholic Diocese of Kindu is a diocese located in the cities of Kindu  in the Ecclesiastical province of Bukavu in the Democratic Republic of the Congo.

History
 April 23, 1956: Established as Apostolic Vicariate of Kindu from the Apostolic Vicariate of Kongolo and the Apostolic Vicariate of Stanley-ville
 November 10, 1959: Promoted as Diocese of Kindu

Leadership, in reverse chronological order
 Bishops of Kindu (Latin Rite)
 Bishop Willy Ngumbi, M. Afr. (2007.04.25 - 2019.04.23), appointed Bishop of Goma
 Bishop Paul Mambe Mukanga (1979.03.15 – 2004.01.26)
 Bishop Albert Onyembo Lomandjo, C.S.Sp. (1966.05.17 – 1978.01.17)
 Bishop Jean Fryns, C.S.Sp. (1959.11.10 – 1965.07.02); see below
 Vicars Apostolic of Kindu (Latin Rite)
 Bishop Jean Fryns, C.S.Sp. (1957.04.12 – 1959.11.10); see above

See also
Roman Catholicism in the Democratic Republic of the Congo

Sources
 GCatholic.org
 Catholic Hierarchy

Kindu
Roman Catholic dioceses in the Democratic Republic of the Congo
Christian organizations established in 1956
Roman Catholic dioceses and prelatures established in the 20th century
Roman Catholic Ecclesiastical Province of Bukavu